Oragene is the trade name for DNA Genotek's non-invasive DNA self-collection kit. Oragene allows the collection, stabilization and long-term storage of DNA from saliva at ambient temperature. Oragene first became available to the genetic research community in 2004. Oragene is available in a variety of formats for various markets. In 2011, Oragene•Dx received 510(k) clearance from the U.S. Food and Drug Administration (FDA).

History
Oragene was invented by Dr. H. Chaim Birnboim. The basis for Oragene is outlined in his 1979 paper which described the widely used method of alkaline extraction of plasmid DNA from bacteria. For the first time, genetic researchers had access to a mechanism to collect large amounts of high quality DNA through non-invasive sampling. Prior to this discovery, the only option for those with this requirement was to use blood samples. Oragene allows donors to spit into a plastic tube to provide a reliable, high quality DNA sample in a non-invasive way.

Features
Oragene is used by academic research institutions, bone marrow donor registries, hospitals, clinical testing laboratories, and direct-to-consumer genetic testing companies who require large amounts of high quality DNA from a large number of donors. The non-invasive collection method offered by Oragene allows collection of DNA from those who might be unwilling to provide a blood sample. In addition, Oragene can be sent via the standard postal system providing the ability for customers to scale their operations on a global basis. Oragene can be used to collect more samples from patients and donors with at-home or in-office point-of-care DNA collection.

Oragene is compatible with a variety of downstream applications including microarrays and next generation sequencing.

Oragene is referenced in over 1100 peer-reviewed scientific journals including the following:

References

External links
 Official Website

Medical equipment